This is a list of compositions by Polish composer Witold Lutosławski.
A complete list of Lutosławski's compositions in chronological order can be found at The Polish Music Center.

By genre

Orchestral

Symphonies:
Symphony No. 1 (1941–47)
Symphony No. 2 (1965–67)
Symphony No. 3 (1981–83)
Symphony No. 4 (1988–92)
Symphonic Variations (1936–8)
Overture for Strings (1949)
Little Suite, for chamber orchestra (1950), for symphony orchestra (1951)
Concerto for Orchestra (1950–54)
Musique funèbre (Muzyka żałobna), for string orchestra (1954–58)
Three Postludes for Orchestra (1958–63)
Jeux vénitiens (Venetian Games) for chamber orchestra (1960–61)
Livre pour orchestre (1968)
Preludes and a Fugue, for 13 solo strings (1970–72)
Mi-parti (1975–76)
Novelette (1978–79)
Chain I, for chamber ensemble (1983)
Fanfare for Louisville, for woodwinds, brass, and percussion (1985)
Chain III, for orchestra (1986)
Prelude for G.M.S.D., for orchestra (1989)
Interlude for Orchestra (1989, to link Partita and Chain 2)

Concertante
 Piano
Variations on a Theme by Paganini, for piano and orchestra (1978, see below)
Piano Concerto (1987–88)
 Violin
Chain II, dialogue for violin and orchestra (1984–85)
Partita, for violin and orchestra (1988, see below)
 Violin Concerto (1994) (fragments only)
 Cello
Cello Concerto (1969–70)
Grave, metamorphoses for cello and string orchestra (1981, see below)
Clarinet
Dance Preludes, for clarinet and chamber orchestra (1955, see below)
 Other
Double Concerto for Oboe, Harp and Chamber Orchestra (1979–80)

Vocal
Lacrimosa, for soprano, optional SATB chorus, and orchestra (1937, surviving fragment of a Requiem)
Pieśni walki podziemnej (Songs of the Underground) for voice and piano (1942–44)
Twenty Polish Christmas Carols (Dwadzieścia kolęd), for voice and piano (1946, orchestrated 1984–89)
Silesian Triptych (Tryptyk Śląski), for soprano and orchestra (1951)
Children's Songs, for voice and piano (1953, orchestrated 1954)
Five Songs, for soprano and piano (1957, orchestrated 1958)
Trois poèmes d'Henri Michaux, for chorus and orchestra (1961–63)
Paroles tissées (Woven Words), for tenor and chamber orchestra (1965)
Les Espaces du sommeil (Spaces of Sleep), for baritone and orchestra (1975)
Chantefleurs et Chantefables, for soprano and orchestra (1989–90)

Chamber/instrumental
Piano Sonata (1934)
Variations on a Theme by Paganini, for two pianos (1941, see above)
Melodie Ludowe (Folk Melodies), 12 easy pieces for piano (1945)
Recitative e Arioso, for violin and piano (1951)
Dance Preludes (Lutoslawski), for clarinet and piano (1954)
Dance Preludes, for nine instruments (1959, see above)
Bukoliki (Bucolics) for viola and cello (1952, arranged 1962)
String Quartet (1964)
Epitaph in memoriam Alan Richardson for oboe and piano (1979)
Grave, metamorphoses for cello and piano (1981, see above)
Mini Overture, for brass quintet (1982)
Tune for Martin Nordwall, for trumpet (1984)
Partita, for violin and piano (1984, see above)
Slides, for chamber ensemble (1988)
Subito, for violin and piano (1991)

Film music
Odrą do Bałtyku (Along the Oder to the Baltic), documentary film (1945)
Suita Warszawska (Warsaw Suite), 35mm documentary film (1946)

Chronological

 Prelude for piano (1922)
 Small pieces for piano (1923–1926)
 Lullaby in E major for piano (1926)
 Three Preludes for piano (1927)
 Two Sonatas for violin and piano (1927, 1928)
 Poeme for piano (1928)
 Variations for piano (1929)
 Dance of the Chimera for piano (1930)
 Scherzo for orchestra (1930)
 Hymn of the Pupils of the Stefan Batory State Gymnasium in Warsaw for mixed chorus a capella  (1930–1931)
 Version for male chorus
 Haroun al. Rashid for orchestra (1931)
 Two songs (Water-Nymph and Linden Lullaby) for voice and piano (1934)
 Piano Sonata  (1934) 25’
 Music for three educational films Fire, Beware!, Short-circuit (1935–1937)
 Double Fugue for orchestra (1936)
 Prelude and aria for piano (1936)
 Requiem aeternam and Lacrimosa for choir and orchestra (1937) 3’
 Symphonic Variations for orchestra (1936–1938) 9’
 Two studies for piano (1940–1941) 5’
 Variations on a theme by Paganini for two pianos (1941) 6’
 Version for piano and orchestra (1979)
 Songs of the Underground Struggle for voice and piano (1942–1944) 15’
 Fifty Contrapuntal Studies for Woodwind, etc. (1943–1944)
 Trio for oboe, clarinet, and bassoon (1944–1945) 16’
 Folk Melodies for piano (1945) 10’
 Five Folk Melodies – transcribed for string orchestra (1952)
 Four Silesian Melodies – transcribed for four violins (1954)
 Three Carols for male and female solo voices, unison mixed chorus, and chamber ensemble (1945) 11’
 Along the Oder to the Baltic (1945) 39’Music for a documentary film
 Warsaw Suite (1946) 35’Music for a documentary film
 Twenty Carols for voice and piano (1946)
 Transcribed for soprano voice, female chorus and orchestra (1984–1989) 45–50’
 Symphony No. 1 for orchestra (1941–1947) 25’
 Six Children's Songs for voice and piano (1947) 8’
 Transcribed for children's choir and orchestra (1952)
 Transcribed for mezzo-soprano and orchestra (1953)
 Two Children's Songs for voice and piano (1948) 4’ written to the words by Julian Tuwim
 Transcribed for voice and chamber orchestra (1952)
 The Snowslide for voice and piano (1949) 5’
 Overture for Strings (1949) 5’
 Little Suite for chamber orchestra (1950) 11’
 Version for symphonic orchestra (1951)
 Service to Poland – a mass song for voice and piano (1950)
 Version for male chorus and piano (1951)
 I Would Marry – a mass song for voice and piano (1950)
 Version for mixed chorus a capella (1951)
 The Road of Victory a mass song for voice and piano (1950)
 Strawchain and Other Songs for soprano, mezzo-soprano, flute, oboe, 2 clarinets, and bassoon (1950–1951) 10’
 Silesian Triptych for soprano and orchestra (1951) 10’
 Recitativo e arioso for violin and piano (1951) 3’
 Spring, children's songs for mezzo-soprano and chamber orchestra (1951) 8’
 Autumn, children's songs for mezzo-soprano and chamber orchestra (1951) 7’
 Ten Polish Folksongs on Soldiers’ Themes for male chorus a capella (1951)
 We Are Going Forward a mass song for voice and piano (1951)
 Version for mixed chorus a capella (1951)
 Nowa Huta – a mass song for voice and piano (1952)
 The Most Beautiful Dream a mass song for voice and piano (1952)
 Version for mixed chorus and male chorus a capella (1952)
 Cockle Shell and A Silver Windowpane (1952)
 Version for mezzo-soprano and chamber orchestra (1953)
 Bucolics for piano (1952) 5’
 Version for viola and cello (1962)
 Comrade – a mass song for voice and piano (1952)
 Version for mixed chorus and orchestra (1952)
 Spring week –  a mass song for voice and piano (1952)
 Version for mixed chorus and orchestra (1952)
 Song about a Sloe-Tree a mass song for voice and piano (1952)
 Three Fragments for flute and harp (1953) 3’40’’
 Three soldier songs  for voice and piano (1953)
 Ten Polish Dances for chamber orchestra (1953)
 Miniature for Two Pianos (1953) 2’
 Three Pieces for the Young for piano (1953) 4’
 A Little Sparrow and A Little Feather, children's songs for voice and piano (1953)
 Version for voice and chamber orchestra (1953)
 Garlands and Goodbye to Holiday, children's songs for voice and piano (1953)
 Dandelions for orchestra
 Sleep, Sleep, a children's song for mezzo-soprano and chamber orchestra (1954)
 Winter Waltz for dance orchestra (1954)
 Night is falling, a children's song for mezzo-soprano and chamber orchestra (1954)
 Vegetables for mezzo-soprano and chamber orchestra (1954)
 Difficult Sums, a children's song for mezzo-soprano and chamber orchestra (1954)
 Concerto for Orchestra (1950–1954) 30’
 Four Orchestral Signals (1954)
 Dance Preludes for clarinet in B-flat and piano (1954) 7’
 Transcribed for clarinet and chamber orchestra (1955)
 Transcribed for nine instruments (1959)
 An Overheard Tune for four part piano (1957) 5’
 Five Songs to Kazimiera Iłłakowiczówna's poems  for soprano and piano (1957) 10’
 Transcribed for soprano and instrumental ensemble (1958)
 Musique funèbre (Muzyka żałobna) (1954–1958) 15’
 Night Owl and A twiglet, a  children's songs for voice and piano (1956–58)
 Song on April Fools’Day, a children's song for voice and piano (1958)
 Cuckoo, Cuckoo!,  a children's song for voice and piano (1958)
 The Tale of the Little Spark and Other Songs for Children for voice and piano (1958)
 On Wronia Street in Warsaw, a children's song for voice and piano (1958)
 Six Christmas Carols for 3 recorders (1959)
 Three children's songs for voice and piano written to lyrics by Benedykt Hertz (1959)
 Three Postludes for orchestra (1958–1963) 17’
 Jeux vénitiens (Venetian Games) for chamber orchestra (1960–1961) 13’
 Trois poemes d’Henri Michaux/  Three Poems of Henri Michaux for mixed chorus and orchestra of winds and percussion (1961–1963) 20’
 String Quartet (1964) 24’
 Paroles tissées   (Woven Words) for tenor and chamber orchestra (1965) 15’
 Symphony No. 2 (1965–1967) 30’
 Invention for piano (1968) 1’
 Livre pour orchestre (1968) 20’
 Cello Concerto (1969–1970) archi 24’
 Preludes and Fugue  for 13 solo strings (1970–1972) 34’
 Les espaces du sommeil  (Spaces of Sleep) for baritone and orchestra (1975) 15’
 Sacher Variation for cello solo (1975) 5’
 Mi-parti  for orchestra (1975–1976) 15’
 Novelette  for orchestra (1978–1979) 18’
 Epitaph  for oboe and piano (1979) 5’
 Double Concerto for oboe, harp and chamber orchestra (1979–1980) 20’
 Grave. Metamorphoses  for cello and piano (1981) 7’
 Transcribed for cello and 13 string instruments (1982)
 Not for You for soprano and piano (1981) 1’50’’
 Mini Overture for brass quintet (1982) 3’ (1211)
 Lord Tennyson Song  for male chorus (1982)
 Symphony No. 3 (1981–1983) 28’
 Chain 1 for chamber ensemble (1983) 10’
 The Holly and the Ivy for voice and piano (1984) 2’
 Tune for Martin Nordwall for trumpet(1984) 1’
 Partita  for violin and piano (1984) 15’
 Version for violin and orchestra (1988)
 Chain 2. Dialogue for violin and orchestra (1984–1985) 18’
 Chain 3 for orchestra (1985) 10’
 Fanfare for Louisville for wind instruments and percussion (1986) 2’
 Fanfare for CUBE for brass quintet (1987) 30’’
 Piano Concerto (1987–1988) 25’
 Slides for 11 soloists (1988) 4’
 Prelude for G.S.M.D. (1989) 4’
 Fanfare for University of Lancaster (1989) 1’
 Interlude  for orchestra (1989) 5’
 Lullaby ”for Anne-Sophie” for violin and piano (1989)
 Tarantella  for baritone and piano (1990) 3’
 Chantefleurs et Chantefables for soprano and orchestra (1989–1990) 20’
 Symphony No. 4 (1988–1992) 22’
 Subito  for violin and piano (1992) 4’
 Fanfare for Los Angeles Philharmonic for brass instruments and percussion (1993) 1’
 Violin Concerto (fragments only)

Lutoslawski